The Western Massachusetts Regional Library System (WMRLS), was a collaborative that was supported by the state of Massachusetts, that provided leadership and services to foster cooperation, communication, and sharing among member libraries of all types. WMRLS assisted member libraries in promoting access to services.  It ceased operations on June 30, 2010 as part of a statewide merger of regional library services into a single entity (Massachusetts Library System, or MLS).  WMRLS existed in a state of dormancy from 2010-2017.  The WMRLS corporation was dissolved in 2017.

Membership in WMRLS was open to any library within western Massachusetts that met the basic requirements set by the Massachusetts Board of Library Commissioners (MBLC). There was no charge for membership.

WMRLS was governed by a Council of Members representing the Region's member libraries. The annual operating budget and Plan of Service were approved by the Council of Members and the Massachusetts Board of Library Commissioners.

There were six regional library systems in Massachusetts. All were administered by the MBLC.  When the other regional entities voted to merge to form the Massachusetts Library System in 2010, WMRLS went into dormancy.

Proposals to cut funding for WMRLS as of July 1, 2010 were reported on in the Greenfield Recorder.

History
Regional library service in Massachusetts began in 1940 when three Regional Library Centers were established.  One in Pittsfield served 37 towns in rural Berkshire County; one in Greenfield served 37 towns in rural Franklin and Hampshire Counties; and one in Fall River served 18 towns in southeastern Massachusetts.  The Centers were administered by the state Division of Library Extension and funded for the first two years with money from the Works Progress Administration (WPA).  The state assumed funding responsibility in 1942.

Between 1940 and 1953 each Center occupied rent-free quarters in its host library, located in Pittsfield, Greenfield, or Fall River.  Operating from each Center was a bookmobile, donated by the Massachusetts State Federation of Women's Clubs, Massachusetts Library Aid Association, and Massachusetts Library Association.  Staffing consisted of a professional librarian, driver/clerk, and office assistant.  Bookmobile service was provided to local libraries, school and deposit stations located at homes in outlying areas, post offices, gasoline stations, and general stores.  Each bookmobile was supported with a 12,000-volume book collection.

Purpose

The purpose of the centers was to "implement, supplement and strengthen public library service in rural areas."  A fundamental and deeply disturbing aspect of library service in Massachusetts was that the library services available to Massachusetts residents were very unequal.  Large and/or affluent communities generally enjoyed high-quality library services, provided by adequately funded libraries.  Small rural communities, on the other hand, seldom had the benefit of adequately funded libraries and consequently had much weaker library services available to community residents.

Problems

Three major weaknesses in the Regional Library Center program were identified soon after its formation: 
Service areas were too large to be served by one bookmobile (which took six weeks to visit each location)
The 12,000-volume book collection did not provide sufficient materials for the population of the service area
Consulting services provided by the professional bookmobile librarian to local libraries were very limited because of the number of libraries served.

A study completed in 1944 recognized that library support in small towns would always be limited because of the narrow tax base. To address this, the study recommended that the Centers be strengthened, that other types of coordinated services be provided, and that additional state funding be made available to equalize library services where inequalities existed.  Between 1945 and 1948, the Massachusetts Library Association tried to win legislative support for a plan to improve library services as recommended by the study, but no plan evolved.

Library federation

In 1948 Archibald MacLeish, former Librarian of Congress and trustee of the Field Memorial Library in the Franklin County hill town of Conway, Massachusetts, suggested that a loose federation of libraries in twelve small neighboring communities (with a combined population of 13,000) be established to share the services of "library specialists" and "pool resources for cooperative use" without relinquishing local autonomy.   The Division of Library Extension was asked to outline a practical two-year plan for such a federation, which would be funded with a $36,500 grant from Marshall Field's and administered by the Division.  The plan produced by the Division called for building on the overloaded books-only service of the Regional Library Centers by establishing an additional book collection, collections of 16mm films and sound recordings available to federation members.  Additional services would focus on adult and children's service development, public programming and public relations activities, in-service training for library personnel and consulting.

Funding was secured, and the federation began operating on October 1, 1950 from its base at the Field Memorial Library in Conway. In addition to the library in Conway, participating libraries were located in Ashfield, Charlemont, Cummington, Deerfield, Goshen, Leyden, Plainfield, Shelburne Falls, Sunderland, Whately, and Williamsburg.

The federation had two primary goals:
To "broaden reading interests and increase awareness of existing problems" facing society by conducting book and film discussions, story programs for children, and book talks for young adults and adults
To "provide a basic collection of books, many of which would be too expensive for the average library to buy"

Staffing consisted of two professional librarians (one a specialist in adult services and the other in children's services) and a clerk.

Public programming for adults and children received major emphasis.  During the federation's two-year operation, the children's librarian conducted programs and book talks in twenty public schools and seven public libraries, in addition to a regular radio program on radio station WHAI in Greenfield.  The adult-services librarian conducted programs promoting reading and talking about the Federation for 80 community organizations and led discussion programs at some public libraries.  The two librarians also wrote a biweekly newspaper column for the Greenfield Recorder, which was designed to promote public interest in library services made possible by the Federation.

In-service training programs conducted by the federation for library staff between 1950 and 1952 were "considered from the standpoint of libraries with limited budgets".  Subjects covered during the two-year period included book selection for reference, children, teenagers, and adults; discarding books; administration; budgeting and public relations.

The amount of advisory service provided to member libraries was limited because the staff was so busy with public-programming duties during the school year that only the summer months were available for consulting work.  Work with community groups was considered a higher priority.  Most advisory-service questions concerned discarding weeded books and public relations activities.

The federation developed a book collection of 3,500 volumes, focusing on new and "standard" works for children and young people, and adult nonfiction to supplement the collections of Federation members. Libraries received 200 volumes for a two-month period. The number that could be made available was recognized as inadequate, but development of a larger collection "would have been to duplicate or over-lap already existing supplementary book services available in the area through the state-operated bookmobile working out of the Greenfield headquarters and serving thirty-seven towns including the twelve Federation communities."

The adult collection was largely serious in nature.  In its evaluation, federation and library-division staff reported that "It would have been relatively easy to buy innocuous fiction and books of travel and biography with wide popular appeal.  Yet the chief aim of the project, as far as adults were concerned, was to increase the amount of serious reading and thinking done by people in the community."   Apparently adult response to this type of collection was not what the Federation had hoped for.  While many libraries reported major increases in children's circulation during the two-year period (doubling in some cases), none reported significant increases in adult circulation.

By September 1952, it was obvious that the federation was so successful that some form of regional library organization would be established on a permanent basis.  The staff recommended that "... the regional center, if established, should devote its major effort to strengthening existing local libraries by providing books, films, records, and professional advice and technical services.  Over the years it should be possible to build up library collections, improve library catalogs, and increase the number of hours the buildings are open to the public.  Prompt delivery service... should be established on a weekly basis, and weekly lists of new accessions should be sent out to permit immediate request of titles desired.  The regional center should eventually provide most of the current titles needed by the small libraries and local funds should be used to increase librarian's salaries, to improve building maintenance, and to permit local acquisitions of new reference books and replacement of worn copies of basic titles.

"Any reorganization of the existing bookmobile service will be difficult.  At present, local librarians enjoy selecting books for loan to their libraries directly from the bookmobile; and residents of outlying sections of the community like the 'curb service' which the bookmobile provides.  However, libraries could receive adequate service more economically by weekly checking of new books lists, and weekly distribution of books by delivery truck.  It is an expensive procedure to service local libraries by a bookmobile staffed with a trained librarian.  Moreover in this era of good roads, and in an area such as this where distances are comparatively short, local residents should be able to secure books from their local library if it is open sufficient hours.  If a bookmobile from a state-financed regional center makes numerous stops in a town, it competes with and weakens the local library, instead of strengthening it.  I should recommend that eventually a state-operated bookmobile either be superseded entirely by delivery truck service to local libraries or that it stops be limited to schools... On the other hand if it is possible for school children to visit the local library during a noon hour or to visit as a class group during school hours, it would seem preferable to provide books and professional assistance through the library,  rather than through a bookmobile".

The final evaluation recommended that the regional center should confine its activity to work with librarians and library boards. While recognizing the importance of conducting public programs for children and adults directly in libraries (which had been stressed by the Federation), the authors of the evaluation noted that a regional library center would be unlikely to have sufficient "collection and technical" resources to support the effort.

Experience with the federation and winning the state funds necessary to continue its program as part of the state regional library center in Greenfield demonstrated that cooperative library support and development programs worked and were capable of winning state funding.  In 1954 the library community was successful in urging Governor Christian A. Herter to appoint a Special Administrative Library Commission to "Study the financial needs of public libraries and to recommend a program for increasing their usefulness to the people."

In 1955, the Commission (chaired by Paul H. Buck, Director of the Harvard University Library) recommended a "state aid program which would consist of direct state aid grants to public libraries" (p. 37, Public Library Reporter) and enlargement of the three Regional Library Centers to serve the entire state and to provide additional collection support and services.  A key element in the Commission's recommendation was that the expanded centers (known as Regional Library Systems) should be built in existing large libraries, which would be reimbursed on a contract basis for providing regional library services.

Legislation to implement these recommendations was proposed in 1957 and enacted into law in 1960. It provided for a maximum of five regional library systems:  Western, Central, Northeastern, Southeastern, and Metropolitan Boston.  Three were actually developed, with headquarters at the public libraries serving Worcester, Boston and Springfield.  A distinguishing feature of the new legislation designed to ensure that special consideration would be given to the needs of small libraries was that "supplementary services" (primarily bookmobile service) would be available only to libraries in communities with populations under 25,000.  Reference and research services (primarily interlibrary loan and telephone reference support to public libraries) was available to all libraries regardless of size.  Film service was also available to all libraries.

The Western Regional Public Library System began operation in 1960.  Three public libraries signed contracts with the Massachusetts Division of Library Extension, agreeing to provide regional library services.  Springfield City Library was designated system headquarters; it was responsible for system administration, and functioned as the system's major interlibrary loan resource center. The system operated as a semi-autonomous department within the library, and system staff were library employees.  The system director was appointed by (and reported to) the director of the library. The Western Regional Advisory Council (WRAC), consisting of the head librarian in each municipality served by the System, functioned as a board of library trustees. WRAC was responsible for approving major budget and service decisions.

The Forbes Library in Northampton and the Berkshire Athenaeum in Pittsfield were also designated as regional libraries.  Their roles were to serve their geographic areas as regional reference and interlibrary loan centers. Requests that the Athenaeum could not fill were forwarded to Forbes; those Forbes could not fill were forwarded to Springfield.  Through the Forbes Library the system also maintained its membership in the Hampshire Inter-Library Center (HILC), which provided access to the 1.5 million volumes contained in the collections of the Five College Libraries located in Amherst, Northampton, and South Hadley.  The reference and interlibrary loan network also consisted of two Intermediate Reference and Interlibrary Loan Centers located at the Greenfield and North Adams public libraries.  Requests that these intermediate centers were unable to fill for libraries in their geographic areas were forwarded to either Forbes or Berkshire Athenaeum.

Upon its founding, the System absorbed the two Regional Library Centers in Greenfield and Pittsfield, which had been operated by the Division of Library Extension.  A third center was also established in Springield, to serve small communities in the southeastern area of the region.  Bookmobile service continued to provide materials to supplement the collections of small libraries and served the public directly in rural areas with inadequate local public-library service.

References

External links
 Western Massachusetts Regional Library System Information at University of Massachusetts Amherst

Libraries in Massachusetts
Defunct organizations based in Massachusetts